Gastón Guruceaga may refer to:

 Gastón Guruceaga (footballer, born 1990), Argentine defender
 Gastón Guruceaga (footballer, born 1995), Uruguayan goalkeeper